Danberg is a surname. Notable people with the surname include:

Carl Danberg (born 1964), American judge and lawyer
Scott Danberg (born 1962), American Paralympic athlete

See also
Damberg